Seid or SEID may refer to:

Medicine
Systemic exertion intolerance disease (SEID), alternative name for chronic fatigue syndrome (ME/CFS)

People
Alamin Mohammed Seid, Eritrean politician
Alan R. Seid (born 1957), Palauan businessman and politician
Joseph Brahim Seid (1927-1970), Chadian writer and Minister of Justice
Ruth Seid (1913-1995), American novelist under the pen name Jo Sinclair
Sattar Seid (born 1987), Iranian cross-country skier
Seïd Khiter (born 1985), French footballer
Seid Memić (born 1950), Bosnian singer

Fictional characters
Pasha Seid, in Verdi's opera Il corsaro
Seid, in Mahomet (play)

Other uses
Seid or Seiðr, an Old Norse term for a type of sorcery or witchcraft
USS Seid (DE-256), a United States Navy destroyer escort of World War II
Secure element ID (SEID), an aspect of near field communication

See also

 Sead (disambiguation)
 Seed (disambiguation)